Han Chang-joo (born December 27, 1995) is a South Korean football player. He plays for Kamatamare Sanuki.

Career
Han Chang-joo joined J2 League club; Kamatamare Sanuki in 2015.

References

External links

1995 births
Living people
Association football midfielders
South Korean footballers
J2 League players
Kamatamare Sanuki players